Merong Mahawangsa is a legendary warrior and a ruler who is said to be the first king of Langkasuka, or modern day Kedah. His tale is mentioned in the Kedah Annals, where it mentions him as a hero who became the first king of Langkasuka.

The legend of Merong Mahawangsa
The Kedah Annals claimed that Merong was a descendant of dhul-qarnain(zulkarnain).

According to the Kedah Annals, Merong was a fighter and ruler of an unknown kingdom. He travelled around from kingdom to kingdom, but mostly stayed in Rome. One day, he left Rome to do some trading in China. But then, after he passed the Arabian Sea, he was suddenly attacked by a legendary giant phoenix called Garuda, that destroyed most of Merong's fleet. They fled to the nearest land, which is Bujang Valley, where they settled and founded the kingdom of Langkasuka.

Merong was the original ruler of Langkasuka before he made his son, Merong Mahapudisat, the king. He returned to Rome, leaving his son to rule after. His fate was unknown, as some say that he died on his way to Rome. His son ruled Langkasuka, along with his descendants, until Phra Ong Mahawangsa converted into Islam and changed the Kingdom of Langkasuka into the Sultanate of Kedah. He also changed his name into Sultan Mudzafar Shah.

Later, the salutation for the king of Langkasuka changed into the Sultanate of Kedah. The name 'Langkasuka' can be divided into two parts: for which 'Langka' meant 'the land of glory' in Sanskrit, while 'suka' means 'joy' or 'happiness'.

Merong and his descendants
Below is the list of the eight rulers of Langkasuka, Merong and his descendants, according to the Kedah Annals:
 King Merong Mahawangsa: A ruler from Rome who later settled in Bujang Valley and founded the Kingdom of Langkasuka. He is said to be a descendant to Alexander the Great. Merong had three sons, Merong Mahapudisat, Ganjil Sarjuna, and Seri Mahawangsa, and a daughter, Raja Puteri, who is the second youngest in the family. He was later succeeded by his eldest son, Merong Mahapudisat. Merong then left to Rome, leaving his son the ruler of Langkasuka.
 King Merong Mahapudisat: He became the king of Langkasuka after his father, Merong Mahawangsa went back to  Rome. He was the eldest son. Legends say that he was also the first king of Siam.
 King Ganjil Sarjuna: He was crowned king after his brother's death. He was the second eldest in the family. He founded the Gangga Negara kingdom.
 Raja Puteri (in English, King Princess): She became the King of Langkasuka after her brother Ganjil Sarjuna died. She is the youngest daughter in the family. She was also the first ruler of Pattani.
 King Seri Mahawangsa: He became the king of Langkasuka after his brother, Ganjil Sarjuna died.
 Seri Maha Inderawangsa: He is the son of Seri Mahawangsa. He was called "Raja Bersiong" or the Fanged King because of his cannibalistic behaviour of drinking human blood. He was the successor of Seri Mahawangsa, but because of his behaviour, the ministers of the kingdom had no choice but to revolt against him. He fled to Mount Jerai, where he remained hidden for a long time and later had a son, who was called Phra Ong Mahapudisat. His son, unknowing of his royal lineage, lived in his mother's village before being called to the palace and had his identity revealed.
 King Phra Ong Mahapudisat: After Seri Mahawangsa's death, Langkasuka needed a successor that had a royal blood. Phra Ong Mahapudist was crowned king after his father's death.
 Sultan Mudzafar Shah, Phra Ong Mahawangsa: He was the only son of Phra Ong Mahapudisat. He was originally Hindu, but when Islam first came to the Malay Peninsula, he became a Muslim, changed his name into Sultan Mudzafar Shah, and the Kingdom of Langkasuka into the Kedah Sultanate.

Merong Mahawangsa in popular culture
 A Royal Malaysian Navy Vessel named KD Mahawangsa is named in his honour.
 "The Malay Chronicles: Bloodlines" was a 2011 Malaysian epic film that tells the life and adventures of the warrior, who is portrayed by British actor Stephen Rahman-Hughes.
 In the Thai film "Queens of Langkasuka", the Kingdom of Langkasuka is mentioned to have been attacked by a rebellion allied with pirates.

See also
 Hikayat Merong Mahawangsa
 Hikayat Hang Tuah
 Sejarah Melayu
 Sultanate of Kedah

References

External links
 Hikayat Merong Mahawangsa - A manuscript at Universiti Kebangsaan Malaysia
 

History of Malaysia
Malay folklore
History of Kedah
Malay culture
People from Kedah